Xenia Jankovic (born 26 October 1958) is a Serbian-Russian cellist.

Biography
Jankovic was born in 1958 in Niš (Serbia) into a Serbian–Russian family of musicians. Her mother was a pianist and her father a conductor. Immediate fascination and love towards cello made her start studying that instrument with her father already at the age of six. Soon after she became a student of professor Janko Ristic from the Music school Belgrade (Serbia) and reached her debut with the Belgrade Philharmonic Orchestra when she was only nine. The result of true commitment came two years later when Xenia Jankovic received a state scholarship to the Moscow Conservatory where she studied with cellists Stefan Kalianov and Mstislav Rostropovich. Later, she continued her work with Pierre Fournier in Geneva (Switzerland), Andre Navarra in Detmold (Germany). She also worked closely on increasing her musical and personal inspiration with Sándor Végh and György Sebők. 
Xenia Jankovic now lives in Germany. She married German cellist Christoph Richter and has a son Alexander.

Career

In 1981 Xenia Jankovic gained proper international acclaim when she became first prize winner at the prestigious Gaspar Cassado competition in Florence (Italy). At the same time she won the Lino Filippini prize for the best interpretation of Brahms. In addition to her recitals all over Europe, Xenia Jankovic has performed as soloist with prestigious orchestras, including Philharmonia Orchestra (London) and the Budapest Philharmonic Orchestra as well as Berlin Radio Symphony Orchestra, Copenhagen Philharmonic, Madrid Philharmonic Orchestra and Moscow Philharmonic Orchestra. 
As one of the most interesting cellists of our time, Xenia Jankovic's recitals have been many times described as deeply moving, unforgettable and sensitive. The Times (London) magazine described Xenia Jankovic's performance of Variations on a Rococo Theme (Tchaikovsky) as "She shoved to be one with the music".
Being an active musician, she has worked closely with Gidon Kremer, András Schiff and Tabea Zimmermann. Today, Xenia performs with her husband Christoph as Boccherini Celludio and with Silke Avenhouse and Arvid Engegard she represents Munch Trio. Xenia Jankovic is regularly invited to appear at international festivals across the globe. In recent years, this prolific cellist gave recitals in many major concert halls in Europe, followed by invitations to music festivals of Bordeaux, Dubrovnik, Stresa, Ludwigsburg, Weilburg and others. She has repeated guest at Gidon Kremer's chamber music festival in Lockenhaus, Sándor Végh and György Sebők festival in Cornwall and many others. In 2012 Xenia Jankovic became artistic director of Chamber Musik Weeks 2012 at Musikdorf Ernen festival in Switzerland.

Xenia Jankovic occupies an important place in the study of contemporary cello music. On her LP's and CD's she collaborated with artists like Aleksandar Madžar, Nada Kecman, Irena Grafenauer and many others while she was playing cello works by Bach, Brahms, Debussy, Tchaikovsky, Prokofiev, Ljubica Marić or Ivan Jevtić as well as cello concertos by Julius Klengel.

Teaching

Xenia worked closely with young musicians over the past 20 years. She was a cello professor at the Zagreb Music Academy from 1985 to 1987, Belgrade Music Academy from 1987 to 1989 and Hochschule für Musik Würzburg from 1990 to 2004. She currently teaches at the Hochschule für Musik Detmold Germany. Some of her disciples were Susanne Beer, Bridget Mac Rae, Sebastian Jolles, Vanda Djanic, Ulf Shade, Dirk Wietheger and Gernot Nutzenberger.

References

External links
Xenia Jankovic official website
Internationale Sommerakademie Bad Leonfelden
Hochschule für Musik Detmold
The Varna Summer International Music Festival
Music Web International
Papillon Concerts
CD Universe
Cellist
Srpska Dijaspora
The Jerusalem International Chamber Music Festival
Konzertdirektion Dietrich

1958 births
Living people
Serbian classical cellists
Academic staff of the Hochschule für Musik Detmold
Women cellists
Academic staff of the Hochschule für Musik Würzburg
Musicians from Niš